Sang-e Sefid (also Romanized as Sang-e Sefīd and Sang Sefīd) is a village in Borborud-e Sharqi Rural District, in the Central District of Aligudarz County, Lorestan Province, Iran. At the 2006 census, its population was 327, in 61 families.

References 

Towns and villages in Aligudarz County